Eucalyptus deuaensis, commonly known as the Mongamulla mallee, is a species of mallee or small tree endemic to a small area of New South Wales. It has smooth bark, lance-shaped to curved adult leaves, diamond-shaped buds arranged in leaf axils in groups of seven, white flowers and bell-shaped, hemispherical or conical fruit.

Description
Flowering has been observed in January and November and the flowers are white.

Taxonomy and naming
Eucalyptus deuaensis was first formally described in 1987 by Douglas Boland and Phil Gilmour from a specimen collected "near Mongamulla Mountain, Deua National Park" by Gavin Moran. The description was published in the journal Brunonia The specific epithet (deuaensis) refers to Deua National Park. The ending -ensis is a Latin suffix "denoting place, locality, or country".

Distribution and habitat
Mongamulla mallee is only known from Mongamulla Mountain in Deua National Park where it grows on steep, rocky cliffs.

References 

deuaensis
Myrtales of Australia
Flora of New South Wales
Mallees (habit)
Plants described in 1987